Colera is a municipality in the comarca of Alt Empordà, Girona, Catalonia, Spain, on the Costa Brava. It is a village on the coast with an economy primarily based on tourism.  It has several beaches within its vicinity including: Garbet, Burro, Atzuzenes, Portes, Morts la de'n Goixa, and Rovellada.

References

External links
 Government data pages 

Municipalities in Alt Empordà